Noel Eichinger (born 2 August 2001) is a German footballer who plays as a centre-forward for 3. Liga club FSV Zwickau.

Career

Wormatia Worms
Eichinger began his senior career with Wormatia Worms, joining the club after three years spent in the youth academy at SV Wehen Wiesbaden. In his first season with the team, he scored two goals across ten competitive appearances, receiving a one-year contract extension in the summer of 2021. Upon the expiry of his contract prior to the 2022–23 season, he departed the team, following 32 appearances and 17 goals across all competitions with the club.

FSV Zwickau
In early July 2022, Eichinger went on trial with 3. Liga club FSV Zwickau, joining the team's Austria training camp. On 13 July, the club announced that Eichinger had signed a two-year professional contract with the club, marking the team's eighth signing of the summer. He made his competitive debut in the club's opening match of the season, coming on as a 65th-minute substitute for Ronny König in a 3–2 victory over Hallescher FC. In that match, Eichinger scored his first professional goal, making the score 3–1 in favor of Zwickau. He would play three more games for the club during the month of August, before breaking his right metatarsal in training prior to the match against SpVgg Bayreuth. He would return at the end of October, registering an assist in his second game back from injury as Zwickau secured a critical victory over VfL Osnabrück.

Career statistics

Club

References

External links
Noel Eichinger at Flash Score
Noel Eichinger at Eurosport

2001 births
Living people
German footballers
Wormatia Worms players
FSV Zwickau players
3. Liga players
Association football forwards
Sportspeople from Mainz